Roy Earl Wright (September 26, 1933 – May 5, 2018) was an American professional baseball player.

Wright pitched one game of Major League Baseball. Signed by the New York Giants after four years of service in the United States Army, he started the last game of the Giants' 1956 season, the second game of a double-header against the Philadelphia Phillies. Wright lasted 2 innings, giving up eight hits (including a three-run home run by Willie "Puddin' Head" Jones), five earned runs and two bases on balls. He took the loss in a 5–2 Giant defeat.

Wright pitched in the minor leagues from 1957 to 1959 before leaving baseball.

Wright died May 5, 2018.

References

External links

1933 births
2018 deaths
Major League Baseball pitchers
New York Giants (NL) players
St. Joseph Cardinals players
Selma Cloverleafs players
Danville Leafs players
Springfield Giants players
Corpus Christi Giants players
Phoenix Giants players
Baseball players from Ohio
People from Buchtel, Ohio